KHBR (1560 AM) is an American radio station broadcasting a country music format. Licensed to Hillsboro, Texas, the station broadcasts to the greater Waco, Texas, area. The station is currently owned by KHBR Radio, Inc.

References

External links
 

HBR
Country radio stations in the United States
HBR